Enlil-nasir I was the king of Assyria from  1497 BC to 1485 BC. In the List of Assyrian kings appears the following entry (king # 62): Enlil-nasir, son of Puzur-Ashur (III), ruled for thirteen years. His name is present on two clay cones from Ashur. He is mentioned in the Synchronistic King list, but the name of the Babylonian counterpart is illegible.

References

15th-century BC Assyrian kings
Year of birth unknown

Year of death unknown